White Cloud Lake is a lake in the county-level City of Zhangqiu, City of Jinan, Shandong Province, China. It is located about 35 kilometers to the east of the city center of Jinan proper, about halfway between Jinan and the City of Zibo, right to north of the Jiqing (Jinan -Qingdao) Expressway.

See also
List of sites in Jinan

Bodies of water of Shandong
Lakes of China